Manchester Essex Regional High School is the public middle and high school for the towns of Essex and Manchester-by-the-Sea, Massachusetts, United States, with an approximate enrollment of 490 students in 6th to 12th grades and a total of 65 faculty members. The average SAT score for the Class of 2012 was 584 in math, 569 for critical reading, and 562 for writing.

Communities 
Manchester Essex Regional Middle High School is situated in the heart of Manchester-By-the-Sea, Massachusetts and primarily serves the communities of Manchester and Essex, which have a combined population of 8,495 people:  5,228 in Manchester and 3,267 in Essex. English is the primary language of both communities, with only a negligible percentage (0.2) of other languages spoken in some homes. The small number of non-white students in the schools accurately reflects the racial and ethnic demographics of the community. According to the 2000 U.S. Census, the median family income in Manchester was $93,609; the median family income in Essex was somewhat lower at $70,152; the disparity represents a correlation with the higher property values along the ocean in Manchester. The unemployment rate in the District is annually 3.5-4% and approximately 6% of the district's students are identified as Low-income.

The school District enjoys strong financial support from the community. The per-pupil expenditures annually exceed the State average; for example, during 2006–2007, the District spent $12,436 per student vs. the State average of $11,210. During the same school year, the percentage of local property tax dollars allocated to schools was 57.4% and the total percentage of school funds obtained from local sources was 81.3%. Only approximately 2% of the District's annual budget is obtained from federal funds. Each year, approximately 10% of the District enrollment is made up of students from neighboring towns through the school choice program.

The District consists of two elementary schools – one in each town – and the single-building Middle / High School. In addition, there are two private elementary schools located in Manchester – The Brookwood School and Landmark School. Within driving distance, there are six additional private, elementary schools, and nine private secondary schools that attract District residents. The total number of school-aged children – Pre-K through grade 12 - living in the District is 1507. Of that number, a total of 34 students (2.25%) attend public out-of-District schools: 11 students (.7%) at the two vocational schools, and 23 students (1.5%) at area public schools. Largely owing to the affluence of the community and to individual family traditions, the District sees a fairly substantial number of students– 20.4% - attend private day and boarding schools. When considering high school age only, the percentage is 29.7%.

Rankings 
Manchester Essex has fallen in state and national rankings in recent years. In 2005, Boston Magazine ranked Manchester Essex as the 3rd best public school in the Commonwealth. As recently as 2009 the magazine ranked the school 12th in the state. However, the school fell to 22nd in 2012 and then went unranked in 2013 by U.S. News & World Report. In 2018, Manchester Essex was ranked the 5th best public school in the Commonwealth.

National and state recognition 
In recent years the school has been recognized for its outstanding green initiatives. In 2011 & 2012 the school earned the President's Environmental Youth Award given by the U.S. Environmental Protection Agency. In 2010, 2011, & 2012 the school won the Commonwealth of Massachusetts Commitment to Environmental Stewardship award.

Manchester Essex has won three national championships in interscholastic debate. In 1987 the team won both the National Forensic League Policy debate championship and the Tournament of Champions. The third championship came in Public Forum debate at the 2006 Tournament of Champions.

In 2011 the school won the Massachusetts Educational Theater Guild Drama Festival State Championship performing The Complete History of America (abridged). They progressed to the semifinals of the competition in 2020 performing “The Losers’ Club,” but the remainder of the competition was cancelled due to COVID-19. 

The school was featured in the 2016 movie Manchester by the Sea, as the school of Patrick Chandler.

History

Essex Schools before regionalization 
Before regionalization, Essex had one public school, Essex Elementary School, which offered instruction to children from kindergarten to Grade 8, and sent its high school students to neighboring districts, including Manchester-by-the-Sea, Gloucester, and Hamilton-Wenham.

Manchester schools before regionalization 

The first record of public education in Manchester dates to 1696 when three town residents were selected to choose a schoolmaster for the town. However, schooling did not become free until 1724. In 1736 the town voted to support four public schools, each its own district. In 1785 the town voted to build the first building dedicated solely to education. However, public education remained fragmented between several small schools and districts until they were consolidated in the mid-19th century.

In 1874 the town opened a new high school in an existing building at the top of Bennett Street. The building was expanded in 1895, 1909, and 1927, making the additions larger than the original building. After the 1895 expansion the building was named for Dr. Asa Story, a longtime member of the School Committee. In 1953 Story High School was moved from the Bennett Street building to Price Elementary School at the corner of Norwood Avenue and Brook Street. The high school retained its name and remained at that location until a new building was constructed in 1962. The Bennett Street building and the original Price School were demolished in 1953 and 1965, respectively.

The 1962 Manchester Junior-Senior High School was located on Lincoln Street. It was designed by local architect George H. Stoner and expanded in 1973.

Regionalization 
In 2000, Essex voters approved a plan to create a regional school district with Manchester-by-the-Sea. Pursuant to Chapter 71 of the General Laws of the Commonwealth of Massachusetts, the towns of Essex and Manchester-by-the-Sea signed the Regional School District Agreement, which was subsequently amended on October 14, 2003 and May 10, 2007. The agreement established the Manchester Essex Regional School District, with a regional school committee consisting of seven members, four of whom were to be residents of Manchester and three residents of Essex, and mandates that the District maintain at least one elementary school facility in each member town.

Under the new consolidated school district, Essex Elementary became a pre-kindergarten to Grade 5 school, with students in Grades 6 through 8 now attending the regional middle school, and Manchester Junior-Senior High School went from graduating fewer than 50 students to more than 100 in less than five years. Already obsolete and decaying, the school suffered significant overcrowding.

As part of regionalization both towns recognized that a new middle and high school would need to be built. In June 2003 the proposal for a $35.5 million middle and high school complex passed overwhelmingly in Manchester, but failed by 11 votes later that month in Essex. The Essex selectmen agreed to hold a new election, but it was voted down again on July 22, 2003.

In early 2006, the voters of both Essex and Manchester approved a project to build a new $49 million regional middle and high school on Hyland Field, behind the existing school. In both cases the project was approved at Town Meeting and then again at the ballot box for a debt-exclusion that permitted the towns to raise funds in excess of the 2.5% property tax cap mandated by Prop. 2.5.

New middle/high school 
Construction of the new school was completed in summer of 2009, and the building was opened on September 9, 2009. It is approximately double the size of its predecessor, but has a smaller footprint since it has three stories. The building opened with about 800 students, 50 more than it was originally designed to hold. Over the following year, the old building was demolished and the athletic fields completed.

Principals

High school  

Between 1970 and 2000, the Junior-Senior High School was led by only four individuals: Richard Howland, Henry Lukas, Bill Foye, and Robert Snaps. However, in the first thirteen years of regionalization there have been five high school principals.

At the time of regionalization, Robert Shaps was the principal of the Manchester Junior-Senior High School. When Shaps was named superintendent in 2003, he hired Peter Sack as interim principal. Before retiring, Sack had been the principal of Swampscott High School from 1983 to 2003.

After two years as interim principal, Sack was replaced by James Lee in 2006. Before coming to Manchester Essex, Lee spent three years as principal of Newburyport High School and four as the school's dean of students. After six years at Manchester Essex, Lee left to become the Headmaster of Braintree High School. Lee was praised by many for his strong managerial skills, straightforward personality, and effective decision-making ability. His accomplishments included leading the high school through both its NEASC accreditation and its transition to a new facility.

In the spring of 2012 Superintendent Beaudoin handpicked Sharon Maguire to serve as interim principal for the 2012–2013 school year. At the time of her appointment Maguire was the school's director of guidance. Reading assistant principal Patricia Puglisi was hired to lead the high school starting in 2013.

Middle school 
In the first thirteen years of regionalization there have been six principals in charge of the middle school.

For most of its history, the high school was housed with a "junior-high". As a result, principals Robert Shaps, Peter Sack, and James Lee oversaw the 7th and 8th grades during the first few years of regionalization. When 7th and 8th graders from Essex Elementary were moved to the Junior-Senior high building in Manchester, Superintendent Shaps hired social studies department chairperson Bruce Kaneb as assistant principal for those grades. In 2007 the middle school assistant principal job was upgraded to a principal position, relieving James Lee of those responsibilities. Superintendent Patricia Foley hired Elizabeth Raucci for the new position. At the time Raucci was serving as the principal of Groton-Dunstable Middle School. Raucci oversaw the integration of 6th graders to the middle school when the new facility was finished in 2009. Hoping to save $60,000, the superintendent had Raucci split her time between the middle school and Memorial Elementary School during the 2010–2011 school year. Five weeks before the start of the 2012 school year, Raucci announced that she was leaving to become the principal of the Rupert A. Nock Middle School in Newburyport. Without the necessary time to do a full search, Superintendent Beaudoin hired Cate Cullinane as a one-year interim principal. Among other administrative positions, Cullinane had been principal of Masconomet Regional Middle School. In April 2013 Steve Guditus was given a three-year contract as middle school principal. After Guditus' contract ran out, he left the school and former English teacher Joanne Maino replaced him.

Academics

Advanced Placement classes 
Sixteen Advanced Placement courses are available in English Language and Literature, United States History, Psychology, U.S. Government, Comparative Government, Calculus, Physics, Biology, Spanish Language and Literature, French Language and Literature, Computer Science A and AB, and Studio Art. During the 2011–2012 school year 106 students took 223 Advanced Placement exams, of which 92% were passing scores.

Co-curricular programs and academic clubs

Student Council 
Manchester Essex has an elected student body that serves as the voice for the majority and advocates on their behalf. The program began in Manchester in 1978  In 2010 a constitution for the program was drafted which outlined the programs organization and function.

Authentic Science Research 
Authentic Science Research is a two-year sequence in which students who are passionate about science are taught the equivalent of a research methods course typically offered to college undergraduates. The seminar format requires that first year students choose an area of research that they wish to pursue, and  become more expert in their field by reading scientific journals. ASR students have library privileges at MIT, Tufts University Library, and Gordon College Library, and have received orientation instruction from university library personnel.

Second year students (juniors) identify local scientists who are researching in their particular area of interest to identify a mentor. The mentor and student design a project of original work for the student to complete in the summer.

The summer before senior year, the student spends full-time in the lab. In past years MERHS has had students travel to Russia and Singapore to study their field of science.

The senior year classroom focus is the writing of their research for the Intel Science Talent Search.

At the end of their senior year, students present their papers at an symposium at University of New Hampshire.

Science League 
The Manchester Essex Science League Team is for students who are interested in applying their knowledge of science beyond the classroom.  MERHS won 1st place in the catapult event in 2012 and the Marine Organisms event in 2022.

Math team 
The Math team at Manchester Essex is a part of the Massachusetts Mathematics League and has been active since the 1970s. The team serves as an outlet for students interested in mathematics by offering challenging problems in a competitive setting. The team was under the direction of former department chair Bob Heil for many years. Heil's successor, Dan Lundergan has led the team since 2004. Each year the program has approximately 15 to 20 kids, representing all four grades. The interscholastic team that represents MERHS at math meets consists of only ten members and are deemed "the regulars." State math league rules allow for only 4 seniors and no more than 8 total juniors and seniors to compete as regulars. The remaining two must be either sophomores or freshman. For participating in the rounds all of the mathletes receive extra credit in their respective math classes.

Math meets consist of six rounds, consisting of geometry, algebra, pre-calculus, and number theory skills. In each round there are three math problems and each student participates in three rounds of their choice. Manchester Essex generally finishes in the middle of the pack at local interscholastic competitions. In 2007 Manchester Essex advanced to the state finals.

Green Scholars
This is an honors course offered at Manchester Essex led by the Green Team director Keith Gray that represents the district's effort to integrate STEAM content, 21st-century skills, environmental literacy and service-learning into a single program. The Scholars course cultivates empowered, informed, and progressive student leaders who will be equipped to face 21st century environmental challenges. The course is designed to motivate students to become proactive and innovative problem-solvers, capable of addressing environmental challenges.

The Green Team course architects (Directors Magers & Morrison) firmly believe that students are inherently curious, creative and eager to solve problems collaboratively. Among other activities, the Directors guide students through a project management process that includes defining the project goals and objectives, identifying tasks, and quantifying necessary resources. To enable collaboration with school staff, the Leadership Team is currently identifying individual faculty members in the STEM disciplines who will collaborate with Green Scholars on individual projects. Some of the recent accomplishments of the program include winning the prestigious Green Ribbon Award, initiating a plastic bag ban in Manchester, and many more.

Journalism 
The Independent, the school's newspaper, was founded in 1991. The newspaper and its corresponding journalism class were eliminated only two years later due to budget cuts. Funding was restore a few years later but the paper remained unstable until Mary Buckley-Harmon was hired in 1997. Since this time the journalism class and its newspaper have been cornerstones to the school's culture.

The journalism class is an honors level English elective for students in grades 10-12. Incoming sophomores who want to take the class must be strongly recommended by their ninth-grade English teacher. Journalism is recognized as a rigorous class that allows students to hone their writing skills over the course of one year up to three years. Most students remain in the class until they graduate, and most experienced writers apply for positions as page editors.

Over the years, several journalism students have obtained paid internships at local newspapers, and many former students report that the skills and confidence they gained in journalism aided them in successful transitions to college and employment.

The primary goal of the course is to develop students’ skills as reporters and writers. Students also learn newspaper design and layout skills. In order to generate topics that inform and entertain the audience, students must think critically and creatively while communicating effectively with each other.

Students attend the annual New England Scholastic Press Conference at Boston University as well as the Suffolk University Greater Boston High School Newspaper Banquet. Students submit individual work and the newspaper as whole to various contests, including New England Scholastic Press, Suffolk University, Columbia Scholastic Press Association, and the Quill and Scroll Society. Recent awards include a Highest Achievement Ranking from New England Scholastic Press, a Silver Medal from Columbia Scholastic Press, First Place for Excellence in Editorial Writing from Suffolk University, and consecutive years of first runner-up and second runner-up in Excellence in News Writing from Suffolk University.

Band 
The school has had a band for most of its modern history. The band has expanded from 30 to 80 students. Former director Joe Sokol created the middle school band and the 5th and 6th grade band. Later a 4th grade band, saxophone quartet, and jazz band were added. The band plays at many events at the school, including pep rallies, the Veterans Day ceremony, and the Memorial Day parade and many more, and was invited to play at Gillette Stadium for the high school football championship game in 2008. Each year the band travels to either Quebec City to perform. The jazz band has approximately 20 members who play at many events outside school. It holds rconcerts every season. , the band director is Joe Janack.

Chorus 
The chorus at Manchester Essex has undergone a transformation in recent years thanks to a new school facility and choral director. Donna O'Neill was hired in 2008 to build the choral program. In four short years the program expanded from 10 to 50 students. Participation is now high enough to justify two, if not three, choruses. Because of the pandemic, participation has dropped to about 25 students.

Besides expanding the regular chorus, O'Neill created the Sound Waves in 2008. The Sound Waves are a specialized group of singers. Within four years the group expanded from 9 to 15 singers. The Sound Waves have been asked to perform at the North Shore Music Theater, Boston University, and other local venues. The Sound Waves perform at almost all school holiday assemblies and have even been on local radio and television. The group often does charity events to raise money for various charity organizations such as HEART and sells CDs every year of their music.

Robotics 
Robots by the C, the school's robotics team, was created in 2005 and competes in the FIRST Robotics Competition each year. Over the course of six weeks, the team builds a robot that is capable of playing a game, which changes each season. The games are often inspired by a sport or based around a unifying theme.  In 2009 the team won its first award at the quarter finals of the Boston Regionals. Two years later the team took second place at the same tournament. In 2017, the team qualified for the FIRST Championship in St. Louis for the first time, and won the Tesla subdivision. The team's funding comes mostly through fundraising and private donations.

Athletics

The Manchester Essex Hornets compete in the Cape Ann League for most sports. The school's traditional rival is Georgetown High School, and the two teams face off against each other every Thanksgiving Day for football. This rivalry has been going on since 1960, when Manchester High beat Georgetown High 22–8.

Formal sports at the high school started with the hiring of Tom Kelley in 1922. Kelley was eventually elected to the High School Coaches Hall of Fame. In 1937 alum Joseph M. Hyland was hired to coach high school sports for $1,200 a year. During his 41 years at Manchester, Joe Hyland's teams won 80% of games played. He was elected to the High School Coaches Hall of Fame and the Massachusetts Baseball Coaches Association Hall of Fame. For his service as a student, coach, teacher and Director of Athletics, the school named their main athletic field after him.

Hyland was followed as Athletic Director in 1978 by teacher Hardy Nalley, who himself was a graduate in 1962. Few could have imagined at the time that Nalley would match Hyland in his longevity and dedication to the school. As a student at the school, Nalley played on seven League-leading teams as well as winning two State titles. After retiring as a social studies teacher, Nalley stayed on as Athletic Director until 2009. Showing his true attachment to the school's students though, Nalley agreed to coach the 8th grade boys' basketball team during the 2010–2011 season. Although he had not coached since 1979, Nalley cannot seem to step away from the school he dedicated himself to. "It's refreshing," said Nalley, who now owns the title of 8th grade boys' basketball coach at Manchester Essex. "The last time I coached was 1979. Boys' tennis. So it's been a while. But the 8th graders are very shapeable, very coachable and they listen to everything you say."

After 31 years as Athletic Director, Nalley retired in 2009. He was replaced by Kelly Porcaro. After Porcaro, Vice Principal Paul Murphy took the job of Athletic Director, while still maintaining his position as Vice Principal. In 2019, Jordan Edgett was named the new Athletic Director, after previously being the Assistant Athletic Director at St. John's Prep. Cameron Molinaire was hired in 2021 as athletic director.

Baseball 
The Baseball program at Manchester-Essex, a member of the Cape Ann Small League, is one of the longest standing sports team at the school. The team was created in 1958 and was coached by Joe Hyland.

In 1962 the team won the Class C Division and was crowned Massachusetts State Champion. The team was coached by Manchester legend Joe Hyland. Future Athletic Director Hardy Nalley was a member of the team, along with Eric Ericson, Elliott Crocker, Buddy Bachry, Peter Foster, Joe Lazisky, Wayne Lynch, Peter Hyland, Tim Logue, Skip Day, Dean Lynch, Stan Koch, George Mixel, Skip Cool, Wally Cammett, Paul Lasowski, Dan Slad, and manager Tom Burtt.

The team would then go on to win another league title in 1975. Other than the two aforementioned titles, the team has had many losing seasons as well as a significant number of coaching changes. In 2010 teacher Bob Garrett replaced Frank Morrisey as varsity coach. In 2012 the team advanced to the North Quarter finals.
Other head coaches included Dick Ananian, Chuck Atwater, Chris Lamothe, and BJ Weed.

In 2019, the team won their first State championship, beating Tahanto 52 in the Division 4 State Championship.

Basketball (Boys) 
The boys' basketball team is one of the oldest athletic teams in the history of the town, with a team dating back to the beginnings of Story High School. The most impressive period for boys' basketball was the 1940s when the team went undefeated in both the 1942 and 1943 seasons.

In 1959, Herb Schlegel best coach ever at the school, took over the head coaching job and continued his career until he won the State Small School Championship during the 1966–1967 season. That championship team defeated Rockport at the Boston Garden. Ralph Kershaw, who lost his life in the World Trade Center on September 11, was a member of the team. Richard Katherman, the first 1,000 point scorer at the school, anchored the championship team.

The team won League titles in 1981, 1982, 1983, 1984, 1989, 1994, 1995, 2003, 2010, 2011, 2012, 2014, 2015, and 2019. Richard Katherman was joined in the 1,000 point club by Dave Mesger in 1991, Joe Mussachia in 2010, and Kellan Furse in 2020.

Recent team coaches include: Hardy Nalley from 1969 to 1978, Fran York in the mid 1980s to the mid 1990s, Billy Cahill in the mid 2000s, Duane Sigsbury from 2008 to 2012, and Bryan Shields from 2012 to 2016, and Timothy St. Laurent from 2016 to the present.

Basketball (Girls) 
In 1926 organized athletics started for girls with the addition of field hockey and basketball at Story High School.

After many years as an activity and club sport, girls' basketball finally achieved Varsity status in 1965. The team won League championships in 1998, 2000, and 2002. The team also won the sectional title in 2000 and 2001. In 2005 teacher Lauren DuBois was hired to coach the varsity team. DuBois played basketball at Beverly High School and Bates College. The following season she led the team to the north semi-finals. The team went on to win the Division 4 North title in 2008 and 2010, advancing to the state championship game in the Boston Garden. In recognition of her efforts, DuBois was named the Massachusetts Basketball Coaches Association Division 4 North Girls' Coach of the Year in 2007 & 2010 and the Boston Globe's Division 4 Girls' Coach of the Year in 2008.

The 2008 team was led by senior Dani Ciccone and freshman Lizzy Ball. Ball would lead the team back to the finals in 2010 and become the first female to score 1,000 points in school history.

In 2015 Senior Sydney Christopher reached 1,000 points to become the second female to reach the 1000 point mark.

Cross Country 
Cross Country is a sport with a long, complicated history at the school. It began in 1967, under the Leadership of Coach Tozier. The team grew in numbers until the 1979 season when they added the girls' cross country program, under the leadership of Coach Anthony. The sport continued, with strong backing, for many years until it ended in the fall of 1989. After a hiatus of over 10 years and a brief partnership with Rockport High School, the seeds of the new era were planted in 2001 when students joined 7th grade teacher A.J. Migonis for casual runs. One of those students, Alex Eaton ('07), would become a pioneer for the team. With the leadership of Migonis and the talent and enthusiasm of Eaton, the team became an official JV program in 2004 and a varsity program in 2006.

Since then, the team has proven itself to be a state-level force to be reckoned with. In 2013, both the boys' and the girls' teams won their respective division six championship races. This was the first time in program history that either team had won its division. In that same year, the boys placed ninth in the division two all-state meet, and the girls came in a surprise second place in the all-state meet (only losing to league rivals Hamilton-Wenham). The girls were helped by a first-place finish from Olivia Lantz ('15), and a very strong performance from long-time veteran Fiona Davis ('14).

In the fall of 2014, both teams repeated as division six champions, securing all-state berths once again. The boys improved to place fifth in the meet, and the girls fell slightly but also had a strong place of fifth under the leadership of coach Mark Dawson and Steven Whitey.

Field Hockey 
In 1926 organized athletics started for girls with the addition of field hockey and basketball at Story High School.

The team won Cape Ann League Championships in 1990, 1992, and 1995. The team was Division 2 North semifinalists in 1991, finalists in 1986, 1990, and 1992, and champions in 1995.

On its march to the 1995 championship, the team tied its all-time high scoring record of 65 goals that it had previously set in 1992. That championship team was anchored by Maura Logue, who was named C.A.L. Player of the Year and a Boston Globe All Scholastic. Logue shared the Boston Herald's Player of the Year Award with teammate Amy Gubbins. Logue and teammate Tambrey Mentus were named to the "Best 20 Seniors in MA" list, with Gubbins joining them for the top best 60 players in Massachusetts.

Football 
During the Second World War Manchester switched to six-man football. With Joe Hyland as the coach in the 1940s and 1950s, the school won 80% of their games and remained undefeated at home for eight years. After Hyland stepped down as football coach, Manchester football was coached by Ed Field Jr. from 1960 until 1973.

After Hyland stepped down as football coach, Manchester football was coached by Ed Field Jr. beginning in 1960. In 1961 Manchester went undefeated and went on to become State Class D Champions, in only its second year of 11-man football. The team was captained by Peter Foster and future Athletic Director Hardy Nalley. Besides Foster and Nalley, seniors Elliott Crocker, John Heath, Don Macreae, Frank Glass, Eric Ericson, Al Clapp, Pete Milner and Bud Backry played on the team. Coach Ed Field was a staple in Manchester Football and is largely credited with building the team in preparation for future glory. Field and Hyland's accomplishments were marked by the dedication of the Lincoln Street and Brook Street athletic fields to each of them, respectively.

In 1981 Manchester led the Mayflower League and defeated Dorchester High School in the Super Bowl 49–6 to win the Class D STate Title. The team was coached by Charles Cook and captained by Eddie Field, Eric Bachry, and Darren Twombley.

In 1982 Manchester High School had ten straight victories during its regular season to lead the Mayflower League. In the Super Bowl the Hornets defeated Natucket High School 28–6 to win the State Class D Championship. The team was coached by Fran York, who was 75-33 as Manchester's coach. The following year the team moved to the Commonwealth League, where they dominated thanks in large part to standout Mark Needham ('87). After about ten years as an independent team, the team rejoined the Commonwealth League.

During the 1999–2000 season, the Hornets were champions of the Commonwealth League and won the Super Bowl to be the Division VI State Champions. The team was coached by Dick Ananian and captained by Nick Ferraco, Dan McLaughlin, and Chris Murray.

In 2019, after consistent finishes in the bottom half of the division, the football team left the Cape Ann League and became an independent team. This led them to their best record of the decade and into the Division 7 North finals, where their season was put to an end by the Greater Lawrence Tech team.

References

External links

Cape Ann League
Schools in Essex County, Massachusetts
Public high schools in Massachusetts